Hsiung Shih-I (also S. I. Hsiung or Xiong Shiyi; 1902–1991) was a writer, biographer, translator, academic, and playwright in Beijing and London. He was the first Chinese person to direct a West End play, and the founder of Tsing Hua Academy in Hong Kong.

Biography
Hsiung was born in Nanchang on October 14, 1902, and educated at Beijing University (then Peiping University). As a professor and writer in China, Hsiung translated plays by George Bernard Shaw and J.M. Barrie. He also published a successful Chinese translation of The Autobiography of Benjamin Franklin. He taught at universities in Beijing and Nanchang as well as Nanyang University in Singapore.

In 1932, he moved to England, studying English literature at Queen Mary College, University of London and translating Chinese plays into English. After the success of Lady Precious Stream in 1934, however, he abandoned his studies.

In 1935, Hsiung's Lady Precious Stream, based on the Chinese folklore Wang Baochuan and Xue Pinggui, was performed at the Little Theatre in John Street, London, by the People's National Theatre, directed by Nancy Price and Hsiung, and ran for 1,000 nights. The play was also later performed on Broadway at the Booth Theatre in New York, produced by Morris Gest. It was adapted for television in 1950.

Hsiung's subsequent works were also successful, but did not match the success of Lady Precious Stream.

Relationships
Hsiung's wife, Dymia Hsiung, was the first Chinese woman in Britain to author a fictionalized autobiography. They shared a flat in Hampstead with fellow expatriate Chiang Yee, author of The Silent Traveller series. Hsiung’s great-grandson is comedian Ken Cheng.

Works
 Lady Precious Stream: an old Chinese play done into English according to its traditional style by S.I. Hsiung (Wang Pao-ch'uan), 1935
 The Romance of the Western Chamber, 1935 (trans.)
 The Professor from Peking, 1939
 The Bridge of Heaven, 1943
 The Life of Chiang Kai-Shek, 1948

References

Works cited

1991 deaths
1902 births
Republic of China translators
Chinese dramatists and playwrights
Republic of China writers
20th-century Chinese translators
20th-century Chinese dramatists and playwrights
Alumni of University College London
People from Nanchang
Writers from Jiangxi